Lenine, is an urban-type settlement in the east of Crimea. It is located in the southwestern portion of the Kerch Peninsula. It is the administrative center of Lenine Raion. The population, according to the 2014 census, is of 7,875.

Name

The settlement has different names according to Russia's Republic of Crimea and Ukraine's Autonomous Republic of Crimea: the former uses Lenine while the latter has used Yedi Quyu since 2016. The naming applies to Russian, Ukrainian and Crimean Tatar languages. As the Ukrainian government exercises no control over the peninsula, the renaming has had no practical effect, as the Russian government protects the Soviet toponymy.

The name "Yedi Quyu" in Crimean Tatar language, means "Seven Wells". Until 1957, it was known as Sem Kolodezey which also means "Seven Wells" in Russian and Ukrainian, but then was renamed after Vladimir Lenin. The railway station by the Dzhankoy-Kerch branch located in the settlement is still called Sem Kolodezey.

References

Urban-type settlements in Crimea
Lenine Raion
Kerch Peninsula